The industry minister is a cabinet position in a government.

The title may refer to the head of the governmental department that specializes in industry. This position may also be responsible for trade and employment, areas that fall under the ministries of commerce and labour in some governments. Depending on the country, the industry minister may have a wide range of responsibilities that could include making decisions regarding utilities and electricity production, presiding over business mergers, and lobbying corporations to build facilities in his or her respective country.

In the United States, industry is the responsibility of the Secretary of Commerce, with an Under Secretary of Commerce for Industry and Security specifically tasked with executing policy regarding industry. In the United Kingdom, the minister of industry is called the Secretary of State for Business, Innovation and Skills, and bears the secondary title President of the Board of Trade.

Country-related articles and lists 

: Minister for Industry 
: Minister of Economy
: Ministry of Development, Industry and Foreign Trade (Brazil)
: Ministry of Energy, Manpower and Industry
: Minister of Innovation, Science and Industry
: Minister of Industry and Information Technology
: Minister of Commerce, Industry and Tourism
: Ministry of Industry and Trade
: Minister of Industry and Foreign Trade
: European Commissioner for Industry and Entrepreneurship
: Minister of the Economy, Industry and Employment
: Minister for Trade and Industry
: Minister of Industry, Energy, and Tourism
: Minister of Commerce and Industry
: Minister of Industry
: Minister of Industries and Mines
: Minister of Industry
: Minister for Enterprise, Trade and Employment
: Minister of Economic Development
: Industry, Trade and Labour Minister
: Minister of Economy, Trade and Industry
: Minister of Industry and Commerce
: Minister of International Trade and Industry
: Minister of Trade and Industry
:  Minister for Economic Development
: Minister of Trade and Industry
: Minister of Industry
: Minister of Industry
: Minister of Trade and Industry
: Minister of Trade, Industry and Energy
: Minister of Industry, Trade, and Tourism
: Minister of Industry
: Minister of Industry
: Minister of Industry and Trade
: Minister of Industry
: Minister of Industry and Commerce
: Secretary of State for Business, Innovation and Skills
: Secretary of Commerce
Under Secretary of Commerce for Industry and Security
: Minister of Industry and Trade
: Minister of Industry and Commerce
: Ministry of Industry and Mineral Resources

See also
 Ministry of Commerce (including Ministry of Industry)
 Commerce minister

Notes and references

Industry